is an Echizen Railway Katsuyama Eiheiji Line railway station located in the town of Eiheiji, Yoshida District, Fukui Prefecture, Japan.

Lines

Station layout
The station consists of one side platform serving a single bi-directional track. The station is staffed.

Adjacent stations

History
Kannonmachi Station was opened on February 11, 1914. Operations were halted from June 25, 2001. The station reopened on July 20, 2003 as an Echizen Railway station.

Surrounding area
The station is in the middle of a residential area. Fields spread out in the distance.
The Hokuriku Expressway's Fukui-Kita interchange is southwest of the station.
The Kuzuryū River flows to the north.
 passes to the south.

See also
 List of railway stations in Japan

External links

  

Railway stations in Fukui Prefecture
Railway stations in Japan opened in 1914
Katsuyama Eiheiji Line
Eiheiji, Fukui